In mathematics, a Godeaux surface is one of the  surfaces of general type introduced by Lucien Godeaux in 1931.
Other surfaces constructed in a similar way with the same Hodge numbers are also sometimes called Godeaux surfaces. Surfaces with the same Hodge numbers (such as  Barlow surfaces) are called numerical Godeaux surfaces.

Construction

The cyclic group of order 5 acts freely on the Fermat surface of points (w : x : y : z)
in P3 satisfying w5 + x5 + y5 + z5 = 0 by mapping (w : x : y : z) to (w:ρx:ρ2y:ρ3z) where ρ is a fifth root of 1. The quotient by this action is the original Godeaux surface.

Invariants
The fundamental group (of the original Godeaux surface) is cyclic of order 5.
It has invariants  like rational surfaces do, though it is not rational. The square of the first Chern class  (and moreover the canonical class is ample).

See also
 Hodge theory

References

Algebraic surfaces
Complex surfaces